Lchashen-Metsamor culture is an archeological culture of the Late Bronze Age and Early Iron Age (1500-700 BC) in the South Caucasus. It was mainly spread in areas of present-day Armenia. Lchashen-Metsamor pottery was also found in the Agri Province of Turkey and in southern Georgia.

Description

A specific grooved pottery is associated with this culture. The construction of widespread cyclopean fortresses at the end of the Bronze Age and cities, indicate population growth and urbanization in the territory of Armenia.

A number of bronze items, such as bronze belts, have been discovered at Lchashen-Metsamor sites. A fully preserved four-wheeled chariot was found at Lchashen.

Categorization

Archaeologists have divided the Lchashen-Metsamor culture into five main stages.

Late Bronze Age - LM 1,2,3

Early Iron Age - LM 4.5

The sixth stage, which arises from the local synthesis of Urartian culture, has been left out.

Identity

Archaeologists connect the Lchashen-Metsamor culture with the Etiuni tribal union attested in Urartian cuneiform.

Later history

The end of the culture begins in the 8th century BC when Argishti crossed the Araks River with his army. With the appearance of Urartian culture, a syncretic Lchashen-Metsamor VI layer emerges.

Paleogenetics

An article by Damgaard (2018) dedicated to the genetic study of ancient inhabitants of the Eurasian steppes published the ancient DNA of two people from Lchashen burials. Samples included Y-DNA I2a2b-L596 and Mitochondrial DNA HV0a and J1b1a.

See also 

 Urartu
 Etiuni
 Prehistoric Armenia

References

Prehistoric Armenia